Muriel Guggolz (February 28, 1904 – February 9, 1995) was an American fencer. She competed in the women's individual foil event at the 1932 Summer Olympics.

References

External links
 

1904 births
1995 deaths
American female foil fencers
Olympic fencers of the United States
Fencers at the 1932 Summer Olympics
Sportspeople from New York City
Cornell University alumni
20th-century American women